Animal Kingdom is a 2010 Australian neo-noir crime drama film written and directed by David Michôd and starring Ben Mendelsohn, Joel Edgerton, Guy Pearce, James Frecheville, Luke Ford, Jacki Weaver, and Sullivan Stapleton.

Michôd's script was inspired by events that involved the Pettingill criminal family of Melbourne, Victoria. In 1991, two brothers Trevor Pettingill and Victor Peirce (along with two other men: Anthony Leigh Farrell and Peter David McEvoy) were acquitted in the 1988 shooting murder of two Victorian police officers.

The film was critically acclaimed and Jacki Weaver received a nomination for the Academy Award for Best Supporting Actress.

Plot
After his mother overdoses, 17-year-old Joshua "J" Cody asks his estranged grandmother, Janine "Smurf" Cody, for help, and she invites him to move in with her. Smurf is the affectionate matriarch of a Melbourne crime family that uses her home as a base. Her home is also being watched by cops who are looking for her oldest son, Andrew "Pope" Cody, who is in hiding. The volatile middle brother, Craig, deals drugs successfully enough to have bought the house for his mother. The youngest brother, Darren, follows the lead of his siblings, while family friend "Baz" leads the gang, which specializes in armed robbery.

Craig takes J along to meet with a crooked cop, from the drug squad, who tells Craig that renegade cops on the armed-robbery squad are on the lookout for all of them. Later, Baz goes to meet Pope at a shopping centre, where they discuss quitting crime and going straight. As Baz gets in his car to leave, police approach, falsely claim he has a gun, and shoot him dead. Angry and distraught, Pope and Craig want revenge and ask J to steal a Commodore and take it to Darren's place. The car is then parked after 2:00 am in the middle of the street as a lure. Two policemen are called to the scene, where they are ambushed and shot dead by Pope and Craig. The next day, Pope, Darren, and J are taken in for questioning, where J meets Detective Senior Sergeant Nathan Leckie, who also leads the armed-robbery squad. Leckie, one of the few non-corrupt police officers, recognises J's predicament and begins to lean on him. The three are later released from custody, and J returns with his girlfriend, Nicky, to her parents' home.
 
Craig, who has avoided being picked up by the police, meets Pope, Darren, and Smurf at a diner, where they realise J is the weak link. After Smurf suggests Craig give himself up for questioning, he panics and goes to visit a friend in rural Bendigo. Craig learns that the house is already being monitored, and as the police arrive he tries to flee through a field but is gunned down.

Pope and Darren take J to meet their solicitor, Ezra. He coaches J to not tell the police anything and pressures him to break up with Nicky, which J does. Leckie takes J into custody again, where he proposes that J be moved to witness protection, but J turns down the offer. Meanwhile, Nicky, unsure what to do, shows up at Smurf's home, looking for J. Pope gives her heroin, questions her, then suffocates her. When J returns to Smurf's house the next morning he discovers Nicky's bracelet outside the house. He calls Nicky's phone and hearing it ring from the backyard, flees to Nicky's parents' house. Pope gets Nicky's address from Darren and arrives in time to intercept J. J flees on foot and is taken into a safe house. With Craig and Baz dead, Pope and Darren imprisoned, and J potentially the star witness for the prosecution, Smurf decides, "J needs to go". Smurf uses her connections to procure J's address and persuades the corrupt cop to help her. Police from the drug squad then raid the safe house. J jumps a fence and returns to Smurf's house, saying he wishes to help free Pope and Darren from jail. To do this, the family's barrister then coaches J's answers.

After his day in court, Leckie sees J before his departure from the safe hotel and asks him if he's "worked out where he fits" (a reference to Leckie's animal-kingdom metaphor for J's predicament). Pope, Darren, and Smurf celebrate with champagne while being interviewed after their controversial acquittal. Smurf later sees Leckie in the supermarket and taunts him. Later, J returns to Smurf's home, asking to stay before going to his room. Pope enters and begins to talk to him but is cut off when J shoots him in the head. In the final scene, J returns to the living room and embraces a now-speechless Smurf.

Cast
 James Frecheville as Joshua "J" Daniel Cody, Smurf's grandson and the nephew of "Pope", Craig and Darren. He becomes friends with Craig and Darren, but hates Pope.
 Ben Mendelsohn as Andrew "Pope" Cody, the psychopathic eldest brother and a robber on the run from the police. His best friend and partner-in-crime is Barry "Baz" Brown.
 Guy Pearce as Detective Nathan Leckie, one of the few good police officers in Melbourne. He tries to convince "J" not to become a criminal.
 Jacki Weaver as Janine "Smurf" Cody, the matriarch of the family, "Pope", Darren and Craig's mother, and "J"'s grandmother.
 Joel Edgerton as Barry "Baz" Brown, "Pope"'s best friend and partner-in-crime. He and his wife Cathy are close friends of the Cody family.
 Sullivan Stapleton as Craig Cody, the middle brother and a successful drug dealer. He and Darren try to protect "J" from "Pope", who hates him.
 Luke Ford as Darren Cody, the youngest of the brothers. He is only a few years older than "J", and the two were best friends as children. He is the first of the brothers to warm up to "J".
 Laura Wheelwright as Nicole "Nicky" Henry, "J"'s girlfriend.
 Dan Wyllie as Ezra White, the family's solicitor who hates Leckie. The character Ezra White (also played by Wyllie) originally appeared as the central character in Michod's 2006 short drama film Ezra White, LL.B.
 Anthony Hayes as Detective Justin Norris, Leckie's partner who helps "J" with his situation.
 Mirrah Foulkes as Catherine "Cathy" Brown, Baz's wife.
 Justin Rosniak as Detective Randall Roache
 Susan Prior as Alicia Henry
 Clayton Jacobson as Gus Emery
 Anna Lise Phillips as Justine Hopper

Production
The film is loosely inspired by the real life Pettingill family and by the Walsh Street police shootings that occurred in Melbourne in 1988. Director David Michôd was interested in the underworld in Melbourne and wrote a script titled J in December 2000. Working at Screen NSW Script Development, fellow producer Liz Watts saw potential in the script. Watts said, "It needed more characterization and structure, which he kind of agreed with. It was important to me that he recognize that there was still work to be done on it." Michôd then did a number of draft scripts gaining feedback from many different people in the film industry. Liz Watts then became a producer on the film with a budget of A$5 million from Screen Australia, Film Victoria, Screen NSW and Showtime Australia. The final version of Animal Kingdom did not contain any of the dialogue featured in Michôd's script for J.

Animal Kingdom was filmed in the Melbourne metropolitan area. The outside funeral scene was filmed in Ivanhoe East, Victoria.

Soundtrack
The film's original score was composed by Antony Partos with additional music composed by Sam Petty and David McCormack. It was released on 16 August 2010.

Release
Animal Kingdom premiered at the 26th Sundance Film Festival on 22 January 2010. It later opened in Australia on 3 June 2010.

Internationally, the film has been sold to the United Kingdom, Italy, France, Canada and Eastern Europe. It was released in August 2010 in the United States and Latin America by Sony Pictures Classics, grossing a total of $1,030,288 in North America. It was released in Australia on DVD and Blu-ray Disc formats on 13 October 2010. The Blu-ray release available from Madman is region-free.

Reception
Animal Kingdom grossed $5,000,018 in Australia, and $2,209,894 elsewhere for a worldwide total of $7,209,912.

Animal Kingdom received overwhelming critical acclaim, especially for the performances of Weaver and Mendelsohn. Review aggregator Rotten Tomatoes gave the movie a score of 96%, based on 163 reviews, and an average rating of 8.00/10. The website's critical consensus states: "With confident pacing, a smart script, and a top-notch cast, Animal Kingdom represents the best the Australian film industry has to offer." On Metacritic, the film has a weighted average score of 83 out of 100, based on 33 reviews, indicating "universal acclaim".

David Stratton said on At the Movies: 

Stratton and co-host Margaret Pomeranz both gave the film four and a half stars.

Quentin Tarantino listed Animal Kingdom as his third favourite film of 2010, behind Toy Story 3 and The Social Network.

In 2015, the film was named as one of the top 50 films of the decade so far by The Guardian.

Accolades
Animal Kingdom received 18 nominations for the 2010 Australian Film Institute Awards, across all major feature film categories – a record achievement. On 11 December 2010, Animal Kingdom won a record 10 awards. The film received several other film awards to Jacki Weaver, who was nominated for the Golden Globe Award for Best Supporting Actress – Motion Picture for the 68th Golden Globe Awards. Weaver was also nominated for the Academy Award for Best Supporting Actress at the 83rd Academy Awards.

It was named one of the Top Independent Films of 2010 at the National Board of Review Awards.

Adaptations

Literature 
Stephen Sewell's novel, Animal Kingdom, A Crime Story (2010), is based on the film.

Television 

The American cable network TNT developed an eponymous TV series inspired by the film, with John Wells as a producer, starring Ellen Barkin, Scott Speedman, Shawn Hatosy, Ben Robson, Jake Weary, Finn Cole, Daniella Alonso, and Molly Gordon.

See also
 Cinema of Australia
 Ezra White, LL.B.

References

External links

Further reading
 
 

2010 crime drama films
2010 directorial debut films
2010 films
2010 independent films
Australian crime drama films
Australian neo-noir films
2010s English-language films
Films about organised crime in Australia
Films directed by David Michôd
Films produced by Liz Watts
Films set in Melbourne
Films shot in Melbourne
Sony Pictures Classics films
Sundance Film Festival award winners
Films about brothers